Rafael Ochoa Guzmán (born 7 February 1955) is a Mexican politician affiliated with the PANAL. He served as Senator of the LX and LXI representing Aguascalientes.

In 2007 he left his seat immediately, on being appointed to be General Secretary of the SNTE. In 2010 he reassumed his seat.

References

1955 births
Living people
Politicians from Veracruz
Members of the Senate of the Republic (Mexico)
New Alliance Party (Mexico) politicians
21st-century Mexican politicians